The Prix Lambert was an award given out jointly in France by the Académie française and the Académie des Beaux-Arts. It was created in 1853 and awarded to "men of letters" (or their widows) who had served the public interest.

Laureates
1963: , Sous les vergnes
1962: Henri Moreau, Le Pêcheur d'or
1939: (the widow of) André Beaunier, edition of Joubert's Carnets
1937: Edmond Joly
1935: (the widow of) Jean Bianquis
1934: (the widow of) Lucien Nass
1906: (the widow of) 
1904: Jacques Normand
1903: Edmond de Mandat-Grancey
1901: Mr. Parodi
1900: Arthur Roë
1899: Mr. Signoret, ms. Yetta Blaze de Bury & Paul Harel
1898:  for Les Derniers Australiens, Nelly Lieutier for L'Oncle Constantin & Marie Koenig for Aimons les champs
1897:  for Le Fleuve des perles
1896: Jacques Fréhel
1895: Jacques de La Faye for Le général de Laveaucoupet,  for L'Aînée & Marie de Grandmaison for Le Petit montagnard
1894: Albert Cim for Mes amis et moi,  for Aux Jardins &  for Anthologie féminine
1893: Robert Vallier for Guillemette,  & Théodore Véron
1892: Oscar Comettant for Au pays des kangourous & Marie Robert Halt  for Le Jeune Théodore
1890: Dardenne de La Grangerie & Marie O'Kennedy
1888: Jules Ferrand, Léon Ricquier
1887: (the widow of) Victor Leclerc
1886: ,  & Gabrielle d’Arvor  (Élisabeth Isnard de Belley)
1885: Émilie Carpentier for Enfants d'Alsace et de Lorraine & Marthe Bertin for Madame Grammaire et ses enfants
1884:  for Croquis et Rêveries
1883:  & Paul de Pontsevrez for La vie mauvaise
1882: Émile Pouvillon for Césette, histoire d'une paysanne
1881:  for Madame Lambelle
1880 (the widow of) Anatole Feugère
1879: Pierre-Marie Quitard for La Morale en action
1878: 
1876: Judith Gautier (wife of Catulle Mendès)
1875: Éman Martin
1874: & 
1873: Charles Nisard for Étude sur le langage populaire ou patois de Paris et de sa banlieue and other works
1872: Gustave Nadaud
1871: (the widow of) Auguste de Belloy for his translations into verse of Plautus and Terence
1869: François Coppée, Le Passant
1868: Augustine-Malvina Blanchecotte for Impressions d'une femme. Pensées, sentiments et portraits
1867: Édouard d'Anglemont & 
1865: 
1864: The widow of Auguste Cartelier for La traduction du Discours d'Isocrate sur lui-même, intitulé sur l'Antidosis revu et publié avec le texte, une introduction et des notes, par Ernest Havet
1863: Léopold Laluyé
1862: 
1861: Frédéric Godefroy for Histoire de la littérature française depuis le xvie siècle jusqu’à nos jours.
1860: & 
1859:Marceline Desbordes-Valmore
1857:Louise Colet
1855: (the widow of) Delrieu
1854: (the widow of) Émile Souvestre

See also
Former prizes awarded by the Académie française

References

Académie Française awards